Underwood's mussurana or Saint Lucia cribo (Clelia errabunda) is an extinct species of snake in the family Dipsadidae. The species was formerly endemic to the Caribbean island of Saint Lucia.  It was originally thought to belong to the species Clelia clelia.  Like other species of mussurana, it is known to have fed on other snakes; one museum specimen is preserved in the act of swallowing a Bothrops species.  Its extinction is believed to have been caused by human activity.

It was mistakenly recorded as present on Dominica due to a cataloging error.

Sources

Malhotra, Anita; Thorpe, Roger S. (1999). Reptiles & Amphibians of the Eastern Caribbean. London: Macmillan Education Ltd. 144 pp. . (Clelia errabunda, pp. 50, 96).
Powell, Robert; Henderson, Robert W. (2005). "Conservation Status of Lesser Antillean Reptiles". Iguana 12 (2): 63–77.

Further reading
Underwood G (1993). "A new snake from St. Lucia, West Indies". Bull. Nat. Hist. Mus. (Zool.) 59 (1): 1–9. (Clelia errabunda, new species).

External links
Clelia errabunda at the Encyclopedia of Life.
Clelia errabunda at the Reptile Database.

Mussuranas
Clelia
Extinct reptiles
Extinct animals of the Caribbean
Snakes of the Caribbean
Reptiles described in 1993